Harry Fowler (1926–2012) was an English actor.

Harry Fowler may also refer to:
Harry Llewellyn Fowler (1895–????), Canadian co-operative organiser
Rem Fowler (Harry Rembrandt Fowler, 1882–1963), British motorcycle racer
Harry Fowler, political candidate in Edmonton West
Harry Fowler (tennis), played in 2009 French Open – Boys' Doubles etc.
Harry M. Fowler, cinematographer for Nuts in May (film)

See also
Henry Fowler (disambiguation)
Harold Fowler (disambiguation)